The Canadian Hockey League (CHL) is an umbrella organization that represents the three Canada-based major junior ice hockey leagues. The CHL was founded in 1975 as the Canadian Major Junior Hockey League, and is composed of its three member leagues, the Western Hockey League, Ontario Hockey League, and Quebec Major Junior Hockey League. For the 2021–22 season, its three leagues and 60 teams represent nine Canadian provinces (52 teams) as well as four American states (8 teams).

The CHL schedule culminates in the Memorial Cup tournament, which sees each of the three league playoff champions, as well as a host team, play a round-robin tournament to determine a national champion. The CHL also hosts the CHL/NHL Top Prospects Game, for the top draft eligible players in the league, as well as the CHL Canada/Russia Series, a six-game all-star exhibition series against a team of Russian juniors. In response to the 2022 Russian invasion of Ukraine, the Canadian Hockey League cancelled the event in 2022.

The current president is Dan MacKenzie, and Gilles Courteau and Ron Robison are vice-presidents.

Introduction
The Canadian Hockey League (CHL) is the governing body for Major Junior hockey (formerly known as Tier One Junior A), the top level of amateur hockey in Canada. The CHL currently oversees the Western Hockey League (WHL), the Ontario Hockey League (OHL) and the Quebec Major Junior Hockey League (QMJHL), with the OHL and WHL having teams in both Canada and the United States. Each league plays individual regular season schedules, and playoffs. The annual CHL championship is determined by the Memorial Cup tournament held in May.

The CHL is generally considered the world's top junior hockey league for developing professional players and is a key supplier of new players and officials for the many North American professional hockey leagues, such as the National Hockey League, American Hockey League, and the ECHL. If a CHL player does not sign a professional contract, many also opt to play for U Sports (formerly Canadian Interuniversity Sport - CIS) and go to school due to CHL sponsored scholarship programs. However, due to the use of paying player stipends and allowing junior players that have signed entry level contracts with the NHL, all CHL teams are considered professional by the NCAA; thus any player who plays a game at the Major Junior level loses their eligibility to play for universities in the United States.

The CHL also seeks to raise the profile of the junior game by hosting annual events such as the Memorial Cup, the CHL/NHL Top Prospects Game and the CHL Canada/Russia Series. The organization also provides many scholarships and bursaries for its players who exemplify extraordinary efforts and community involvement. These programs are supported by the many corporate sponsors.

History
On May 9, 1975, officials from the Western Canada Hockey League, the Ontario Major Junior Hockey League and the Quebec Major Junior Hockey League, announced a constitution to establish the Canadian Major Junior Hockey League (CMJHL) composed of the three league under one umbrella. The new organization wanted standard contracts for all players, consistent dollar amounts for development fees paid by professional leagues to sign junior players, and for the National Hockey League and the World Hockey Association to work together on a common drafting program to eliminate bidding wars. The CMJHL sought to represent players directly instead of agents, and proposed an escalating development fee schedule if professional teams wanted to sign a player while he was still eligible for junior hockey. The league also proposed to allow some players under professional contracts to continue playing in junior hockey. Ontario's commissioner Tubby Schmalz defended the validity of the constitution, despite a challenge from Alan Eagleson that it violated antitrust laws in Canada and the United States.

On July 30, 2019, Dan MacKenzie was announced as the new full-time president as of September 2019, taking over for David Branch. In March 2020, the CHL and its constituent leagues cancelled the remainder of the 2019–20 regular seasons, playoffs and the 2020 Memorial Cup, due to the COVID-19 pandemic in North America.

The QMJHL and WHL played a 2020–21 season with limitations; the WHL played a shortened season consisting exclusively of regional play and no playoffs, with "bubbles" used for all B.C. and East Division games. The QMJHL was the only CHL league to play a full season with playoffs, albeit with disruptions and the use of bubbles due to public health orders in Quebec and travel restrictions in Atlantic Canada. Due to public health orders in Ontario, the OHL indefinitely delayed, and later cancelled the 2020–21 season. The Memorial Cup was cancelled and not awarded for the second consecutive season. 

On July 21, 2021, the CHL announced a new national media rights deal with Bell Media and the CBC (replacing a long-standing relationship with Sportsnet), under which TSN (English) and RDS (French) will serve as the CHL's national media partners. TSN will carry 30 regular season games per-season, RDS will carry 20 regular season games per-season, and both will carry coverage of selected playoff games and CHL national events (including the Memorial Cup). CBC Sports will also carry coverage of selected games beginning in the 2021–22 season, including a package of early-season games, and a game of the week package on TSN, RDS, and CBC Gem.

Annual events

Memorial Cup

The Memorial Cup Tournament is the championship of Junior Canadian hockey. Each year it features the champions from the (WHL, OHL, QMJHL) and the host CHL team. The host team changes from year to year, and is selected by a bidding process prior to the start of each season. The annual event is one of the biggest sporting events in North America, attracting thousands of spectators and generating increasing revenue for both the CHL teams and the host city.

CHL/NHL Top Prospects Game

The CHL/NHL Top Prospects Game is an annual event sponsored by Home Hardware and hosted by the CHL in which 40 of the top NHL Entry Draft eligible prospects in the Canadian Hockey League play against each other much like an all-star game. Each draft prospect hopes to boost their draft ranking with the NHL scouts and general managers who attend. The players are typically coached by a pair of hockey celebrities, usually Don Cherry and Bobby Orr. The event has been held annually since 1992. From 1992 to 1995 the event was known as the CHL All-Star Challenge and usually pitted one of the CHL's leagues against the other two.

CHL Canada/Russia Series

The CHL Canada/Russia Series is an annual junior ice hockey exhibition tournament held between a select team of Russian players and all-star teams representing the Quebec Major Junior Hockey League, the Ontario Hockey League and the Western Hockey League. The event is organized by the Canadian Hockey League and consists of six games total each year, with the Russian Selects playing two games versus each league's all-star team. All games are broadcast nationally in Canada on Sportsnet. The series often features players from the Canadian national junior team, and the Russian national junior team. 

In response to the 2022 Russian invasion of Ukraine, the Canadian Hockey League cancelled the event in 2022.

CHL Import Draft

The CHL Import Draft is an annual event in which every team in the Canadian Hockey League may select the rights to eligible import players. An import is classified as a player whose parents are not residents of Canada or the United States. The draft is conducted online, during the last week of June, or first week of July. Teams from the Western Hockey League, Ontario Hockey League, and Quebec Major Junior Hockey League, systematically take turns making selections in reverse order of the team's standings in the CHL from the previous season. Teams can have a maximum of two imports, which may only be obtained through the draft.

Trophies and awards

The Canadian Hockey League awards sixteen annual trophies for accomplishments during the regular and at the Memorial Cup to top individuals and teams among its three member leagues. The Memorial Cup is the top award for the championship team at the end-of-season Memorial Cup tournament. A set of five individual awards are given for performance at the tournament. In the regular season, Canadian Hockey League also presents ten annual awards. The nominees for each individual award are determined by the winner of the corresponding award handed out by each of the Canadian Hockey League's three member leagues, the Ontario Hockey League, the Quebec Major Junior Hockey League, and the Western Hockey League.

Teams
For the 2021–22 season the league includes 60 teams located in nine Canadian provinces (52 teams) and four American states (8 teams). Currently, nine of the ten Canadian provinces have a member team. Newfoundland and Labrador is the only province without a team.

 The Western Hockey League, with 22 teams in British Columbia (5), Alberta (5), Saskatchewan (5), Manitoba (2), Washington (4), and Oregon (1).
 The Ontario Hockey League, with 20 teams in Ontario (17), Michigan (2), and Pennsylvania (1).
 The Quebec Major Junior Hockey League, with 18 teams in Quebec (12), New Brunswick (3), Nova Scotia (2), and Prince Edward Island (1).

Ontario Hockey League
Barrie Colts
Erie Otters
Flint Firebirds
Guelph Storm
Hamilton Bulldogs
Kingston Frontenacs
Kitchener Rangers
London Knights
Mississauga Steelheads
Niagara IceDogs
North Bay Battalion
Oshawa Generals
Ottawa 67's
Owen Sound Attack
Peterborough Petes
Saginaw Spirit
Sarnia Sting
Sault Ste. Marie Greyhounds
Sudbury Wolves
Windsor Spitfires

Quebec Major Junior Hockey League
Acadie–Bathurst Titan
Baie-Comeau Drakkar
Blainville-Boisbriand Armada
Cape Breton Eagles
Charlottetown Islanders
Chicoutimi Saguenéens
Drummondville Voltigeurs
Gatineau Olympiques
Halifax Mooseheads
Moncton Wildcats
Quebec Remparts
Rimouski Océanic
Rouyn-Noranda Huskies
Saint John Sea Dogs
Shawinigan Cataractes
Sherbrooke Phoenix
Val-d'Or Foreurs
Victoriaville Tigres

Western Hockey League
Brandon Wheat Kings
Calgary Hitmen
Edmonton Oil Kings
Everett Silvertips
Kamloops Blazers
Kelowna Rockets
Lethbridge Hurricanes
Medicine Hat Tigers
Moose Jaw Warriors
Portland Winterhawks
Prince Albert Raiders
Prince George Cougars
Regina Pats
Red Deer Rebels
Saskatoon Blades
Seattle Thunderbirds
Spokane Chiefs
Swift Current Broncos
Tri-City Americans
Vancouver Giants
Victoria Royals
Winnipeg Ice

Attendance
Listed below are the top CHL teams by average attendance for the 2018–19 regular season. Teams with an average attendance over 5,000 are shown.

The CHL single game attendance record is held by the London Knights and Plymouth Whalers for the December 29, 2013 outdoor game at Comerica Park in Detroit, Michigan.  A total of 26,384 spectators took in the game.

References

External links

 Official website